Tell Wardiyat, is a village located in al-Hasakah Governorate in northeastern Syria. The village is inhabited by Assyrians belonging to the Assyrian Church of the East and the Syriac Orthodox Church.

See also

Assyrians in Syria
List of Assyrian settlements
Al-Hasakah offensive (February–March 2015)

References

Populated places in al-Hasakah District
Assyrian communities in Syria
Villages in al-Hasakah Governorate